Arthur Clamp (1 May 1884 – 19 September 1918) was an English professional footballer who made over 270 appearances in the Football League for Notts County. A centre half, "he possessed remarkable stamina and above all, excelled as a breaker-up of combination".

Personal life 
The son of Thomas and Caroline Clamp, Clamp worked as a bricklayer and was married with children. His great-grandson Steve Clamp became a journalist and presenter. In April 1918, during the final year of the First World War, Clamp was called up to serve as a private in the British Army. After a period with the Sherwood Foresters, he was transferred to the 7th Battalion, Queen's Royal Regiment (West Surrey) upon his arrival in France. Within three days of his arrival in the trenches, he was seriously wounded at Trônes Wood during the Second Battle of the Somme. Clamp was evacuated to Britain, where he died in Stoke-on-Trent Military Hospital on 19 September 1918. He was buried with military honours in Church Cemetery, Nottingham.

Career statistics

Honours 
Notts County

 Football League Second Division: 1913–14

References 

1884 births
People from Sneinton
Footballers from Nottinghamshire
English footballers
Association football wing halves
English Football League players
Carlton Town F.C. players
Notts County F.C. players
British Army personnel of World War I
1918 deaths
Sherwood Foresters soldiers
Queen's Royal Regiment soldiers
British military personnel killed in World War I
British bricklayers
20th-century British businesspeople
Footballers from Nottingham
Military personnel from Nottinghamshire
Burials in Nottinghamshire